St Fintan's, Mountrath is a hurling and Gaelic football club in Mountrath, County Laois, Ireland. They play at St Fintan's GAA Grounds.

The club colours are red and white.

History
The club is a senior hurling club and won its only Laois Senior Hurling Championship in 1942.

Mountrath has also won the Laois Intermediate Hurling Championship five times (1941, 1949, 1990, 1996 and 2001) and the Laois Junior Hurling Championship four times (1940, 1960, 1975 and 1989). Also in 1940, Mountrath won the Laois Minor Hurling Championship for the only time in its history.

Gaelic football is very much a secondary sport in the club but the club has one Laois Junior Football Championships to its credit, won in 1939. In 1996, St Fintan's also won the Laois Junior B Football Championship.

Achievements
 Laois Senior Hurling Championship: (1) 1942
 Laois Intermediate Hurling Championship (5) 1941, 1949, 1990, 1996, 2001
 Laois Junior Hurling Championship: (4) 1940, 1960, 1975, 1989
 Laois Minor Hurling Championship (1) 1940
 Laois Junior Football Championships (1) 1939
 Laois Junior B Football Championship (1) 1996
 Laois All-County Football League Division 4: (1) 1997
 Laois All-County Football League Division 5: (1) 2008

Hyland

References

Gaelic games clubs in County Laois
Hurling clubs in County Laois
Gaelic football clubs in County Laois